Jeffrey C. McNeely is a Republican member of the North Carolina House of Representatives who has represented the 84th district (including parts of Iredell County) since 2019.

Committee assignments

2019-2020 session
Agriculture
Education - K-12
Appropriations
Appropriations - Justice and Public Safety
Judiciary

2021-2022 session
Agriculture (Chair)
Education - K-12
Appropriations 
Appropriations - Agriculture and Natural and Economic Resources 
Judiciary IV

Electoral history

References

Living people
Year of birth missing (living people)
North Carolina State University alumni
Republican Party members of the North Carolina House of Representatives
21st-century American politicians